Dita (formerly known as Mey Chan, born 14 May 1986, Malang) is an Indonesian singer who is a former member of the band 
.

Biography

Duo MAIA
At 2008, Chan passed an audition and was selected by Maia Estianty to join her. But finally Mey joined Maia and released the album titled Duo Maia, Maia & Friends (2008).

Discography

MAIA
 Maia & Friends (2008)
 Sang Juara (2009)
 Maia Pasto with the Stars (2015)

Singles 
 Jangan Selingkuh
 Gengsi Setengah Mati
 Korban Cinta
 Setia (2018, as Dita)
 Ibu (2019, as Dita)
 Lagu Rindu (2020, as Dita)

Filmography
 XXL-Double Extra Large (2009)

References

External links 

 

1986 births
21st-century Indonesian women singers
Indonesian pop singers
Indonesian people of Chinese descent
Living people
Musicians from East Java
People from Malang
Javanese people